George Butcher (25 October 1890 – 11 January 1970) was an English footballer who played as an inside forward for various clubs in the early 1900s, including St Albans City, West Ham United and Luton Town. He was also the amateur lightweight boxing champion of Hertfordshire.

Playing career
Butcher was born in St Albans, Hertfordshire and started his career with his home town side, St Albans City. He moved to West Ham in 1909 and scored on his debut on 2 March 1910 in a 2–1 away defeat to Watford played at their Cassio Road stadium. He has made over 70 appearances before his playing-time was limited by the outbreak of World War I. Making 33 appearances in the first season after the end of the war, Butcher made only one appearance the following season before transferring to Luton Town in 1921 where he remained for the next five seasons.

After football
After retiring from football in 1926, Butcher returned to his family business of building artesian wells.

References

1890 births
1970 deaths
Sportspeople from St Albans
English footballers
Southern Football League players
English Football League players
West Ham United F.C. players
St Albans City F.C. players
Luton Town F.C. players
Lightweight boxers
English male boxers
Association football inside forwards